General Belov may refer to:

Ivan Belov (commander) (1893–1938), Soviet military commander
Nikolay Belov (general) (1896–1941), Red Army major general in  World War II
Pavel Belov (1897–1963), Soviet Army colonel general